Gris is a platform-adventure game by Spanish developer Nomada Studio and published by Devolver Digital. The game was released for macOS, Nintendo Switch, and Windows in December 2018, for iOS in August 2019, for PlayStation 4 in November 2019, for Android in April 2020, for Amazon Luna in November 2021, and for PlayStation 5, Xbox One and Xbox Series X/S in December 2022. The game has sold over 1 million copies.

Synopsis 
The game follows a girl named Gris, who wakes up in the palm of a crumbling statue of a woman. She attempts to sing out, but quickly becomes choked up and the statue's hands crumble, dropping her to the colourless earth below. After landing, she continues walking forward and discovers a number of strange structures that seem to be powered by mysterious points of light resembling stars. Gris can collect these lights to gain new abilities, such as turning into a heavy block of stone, and creating new pathways made of constellations.

After reaching a central tower, Gris can travel to four new locations to collect lights and restore colour back to her world at statues resembling the broken one from the beginning of the story. These areas include a desert filled with windmills, a lush forest, underwater caverns, and a world with buildings made of light. Along the way she encounters various living beings, some of which help her on her journey, as well as an inky black monster which manifests as large creatures that threaten to consume her. The final power Gris obtains is the ability to sing again, which brings life to various plants and mechanical animals. In addition, hints throughout the story via other statues similar to the first reveal that the woman that Gris constantly grieves in front is her late mother.

Gris eventually collects enough stars to form a constellation path to the heavens, but the final pathway is blocked by the creature, who morphs into a monstrous form of herself and swallows her whole. She wakes up in an ocean of toxic black sludge and swims to the surface. As she climbs a tower rising out of the ocean, the creature tries to pull her back. However, Gris begins singing and her mother's statue begins to reform itself through the power of her voice. Just as she is completely consumed by the black oil, the statue of Gris's mother comes alive and begins singing as well, banishing the creature and the sea of despair. Encouraged by her mother's song, Gris continues to sing and the duet fully restores the world back to its beauty and colour. Gris and her mother tearfully embrace, with Gris giving a farewell kiss and she climbs the final constellation path into the light and the unknown, having accepted her mother's death and moving forward with the knowledge of her mother's love still being with her.

If all mementos are collected, Gris's childhood is revealed in a secret room. It is nighttime. A child Gris is in the meadows with her mother. Gris's mother encloses a firefly between her hands then releases it to fly around child Gris. Then under the bright full moon child Gris and her mother embrace.

Development 

Gris was developed by Nomada Studio, a Barcelona-based company which was formed after a chance meeting between two Ubisoft employees, Roger Mendoza and Adrián Cuevas, and artist Conrad Roset. The two met Roset while attending a going away party held for Cuevas who was temporarily moving to Ubisoft Montreal to work on Rainbow Six Siege. Roset noted to Mendoza and Cuevas that he was interested in working on video games, at the time the two were interested in creating an independent game but lacked the artistic skills, so the three decided to form Nomada Studios.

Intending the game to be "a mix of Journey and Ori and the Blind Forest", the game was designed with accessibility in mind. As such there are no fail states, a decision that proved to be challenging. Mendoza has described their approach as "If there's a puzzle you can probably finish it at the second or third try. When the puzzle is more complicated, we give the player options." Partway through development the team consulted with a psychologist about the game's narrative themes of grief (especially the five stages of grief) and depression, resulting in gameplay decisions to echo the turmoil of the main character. An example of this is how at the beginning of the game the player is unable to jump which helps reinforce the notion that "something is wrong with this girl".

The art style created some unique problems for the developers. Since the game becomes more lively as players progress designing the early areas in an appealing way proved challenging. The team eventually solved this problem by taking inspiration from Iwagumi style aquariums. Another challenging issue was readability, which resulted in several level design and camera angle tweaks during development. Initially the main character's dress was going to change as more colors became unlocked, however this eventually proved impractical due partly to the camera angles. The game's title refers to the name of the protagonist, as well as the Spanish word for the colour grey.

Reception 

Gris received "generally favorable" reviews, according to review aggregator Metacritic.

EGMNow wrote that "with an arresting art style and admirable commitment to minimalist game design, Gris manages to turn a straightforward, often derivative platformer into something that feels far more special and important."

GameSpot stated "Gris understands intrinsically how magical video games can be and continually pushes your imagination until you're almost bursting with joy. The ways in which it reinvents itself as you gain powers and dive ever deeper into this world is truly special, and just as it knows exactly when to pull back the camera or introduce a new song, it's keenly aware of when it's time to say goodbye. Like a comet streaking across the sky, Gris is full of wonder and beauty and leaves you with a warm glow in your heart."

Apple stated "This spectacularly satisfying puzzle-platformer is a soul-stirring work of digital art—one that explores hope, grief and the triumph of piecing a life back together after tragic loss" and awarded it Mac Game of the Year in 2019.

Sales 
As of March 2019, Gris has sold 300,000 copies worldwide. By April 2020, sales exceeded one million units.

Accolades

Legacy
In 2021, GQ España named Gris one of the best Spanish-made games ever.

See also
Do Not Feed the Monkeys
The Red Strings Club

References

External links

2018 video games
Adventure games
Art games
Android (operating system) games
Annie Award winners
Devolver Digital games
Platform games
Indie video games
IOS games
MacOS games
Nintendo Switch games
Video games developed in Spain
Windows games
Video games about mental health
PlayStation 4 games
The Game Awards winners